Zhongxiao Dunhua (formerly transliterated as Chunghsiao Tunhua Station until 2003) is a metro station in Taipei, Taiwan served by Taipei Metro.

Station overview

The three-level, underground station with an island platform and eight exits. It is located around the intersection of Zhongxiao East Rd. and Dunhua South Rd (hence the name of the station). It connects through the East Metro Mall to the neighboring Zhongxiao Fuxing station.

History
24 December 1999: Begins service with the opening of the Taipei City Hall to Longshan Temple segment.
3 May 2009: A 62-year-old woman jumped off platform 2 and was immediately killed. The Taipei City Hall-Zhongxiao Fuxing segment was single-tracked until past midnight.

Station layout

Exits
Exit 1: No.175, Zhongxiao E. Rd. Sec. 4
Exit 2: No.203, Zhongxiao E. Rd. Sec. 4  Escalator
Exit 3: No.182, Zhongxiao E. Rd. Sec. 4 (Ming Yao Department Store) Escalator
Exit 4: No.166, Zhongxiao E. Rd. Sec. 4 (San Want Hotel)
Exit 5: No.148, Zhongxiao E. Rd. Sec. 4 Escalator
Exit 6: No.219, Dunhua S. Rd. Sec. 1
Exit 7: No.151, Zhongxiao E. Rd. Sec. 4 Escalator
Exit 8: No.209, Dunhua S. Rd. Sec. 1

Around the station
 Dinho Shopping District
 Eslite Bookstore (Dunhua Branch)
 Singapore Trade Office in Taipei
 Sogo (Dunhua Branch)
 MING YAO Department Store - exit 3
 Breeze Center (Zhongxiao Branch)
 The International Commercial Bank of China (between this station and Sun Yat-sen Memorial Hall station)
 San Want Hotel - exit 4
 Lee Shih-chiao Art Museum
 Fuxing Elementary School
 Renai Junior High School
 Zhongshan Hospital
 Renai Elementary School

Underground Shopping
East Metro Mall (connects directly to the station, toward Zhongxiao Fuxing)

References

Railway stations opened in 2000
Bannan line stations